A chancel is a part of a church building.

Chancel may also refer to:

People

Surnamed
Chancel is a French surname. Notable people with the surname include:

 Annie Chancel (born 1945), French pop singer
 François Joseph Lagrange-Chancel (1677–1758), French satirist and playwright
 Gustav Chancel (1822–1890), French chemist
 Jacques Chancel (1928–2014), French writer
 Jules Chancel (1867–1944), French writer
 Lucas Chancel (born 1987), French economist

Given named
 Chancel Massa (born 1985), Congolese soccer player
 Chancel Mbemba (born 1994), Congolese soccer player
 Chancel Ndaye (born 1999), Burundian soccer player
 Chancel Ilunga Sankuru (born 1995), Congolese middle distance runner

See also

 
 Cancel (disambiguation)
 Chancellor (disambiguation)